= Results of the 1874 Canadian federal election =

1874 Canadian federal election

== Results by Province ==
=== British Columbia ===
Results in British Columbia
Party	Seats	Second	Third	Fourth	Votes	%	+/-
Liberals	3	0	0	0	679	34.24	
Unknown	0	3	2	1	577	29.1	
Liberal–Conservative	1	1	0	0	334	16.84	
Independent Liberal	0	1	0	0	304	15.33	
Conservative	1	0	0	0	89	4.49	
Total	5				1,983	100.0	

=== Manitoba ===
Results in Manitoba
Party	Seats	Second	Votes	%	+/-
Liberals	1	2	969	46.97	
Independent Conservative	1	0	329	15.95	
Conservative	1	0	285	13.81	
Unknown	0	2	285	13.81	
Independent	1	0	195	9.45	
Total	4		2,063	100.0	

=== New Brunswick ===
Results in New Brunswick
Party	Seats	Second	Third	Votes	%	+/-
Liberals	9	2	0	11,436	47.12	
Unknown	0	6	2	4,821	19.86	
Independent	2	1	0	4,271	17.6	
Liberal–Conservative	1	1	0	2,090	8.61	
Conservative	2	0	0	1,651	6.8	
Independent Liberal	1	0	0	0	0	
Total	15			24,269	100.0	

=== Nova Scotia ===
Results in Nova Scotia
Party	Seats	Second	Third	Fourth	Votes	%	+/-
Liberals	13	4	0	0	14,788	38.07	
Liberal–Conservative	2	2	2	0	7,474	19.24	
Conservative	2	2	0	1	6,913	17.8	
Unknown	0	4	1	0	3,503	9.02	
Independent Liberal	1	0	0	0	3,186	8.2	
Independent	0	1	0	0	2,979	7.67	
Total	18				38,843	100.0	

=== Ontario ===
Results in Ontario
Party	Seats	Second	Third	Fourth	Votes	%	+/-
Liberals	60	6	0	0	72,328	40.32	
Unknown	0	45	7	1	48,848	27.23	
Conservative	15	15	0	0	34,902	19.46	
Liberal–Conservative	9	5	0	0	17,300	9.64	
Independent Liberal	2	0	0	0	3,051	1.7	
Conservative-Labour	0	0	0	1	1,515	0.84	
Independent	0	1	0	0	1,436	0.8	
Total	86				179,380	100.0	

=== Prince Edward Island ===
Results in Prince Edward Island
Party	Seats	Second	Third	Fourth	Votes	%	+/-
Liberals	2	3	0	0	5,522	56.76	
Conservative	1	0	0	0	1,704	17.52	
Liberal–Conservative	0	0	1	0	1,496	15.38	
Unknown	0	0	1	1	1,006	10.34	
Total	3				9,728	100.0	

=== Quebec ===
Results in Quebec
Party	Seats	Second	Third	Votes	%	+/-
Liberals	35	2	0	23,008	34.68	
Unknown	0	25	2	17,171	25.88	
Conservative	16	8	1	13,096	19.74	
Liberal–Conservative	12	0	0	9,465	14.27	
Independent Conservative	2	0	0	2,031	3.06	
Independent	0	1	0	1,572	2.37	
Total	65			66,343	100.0	
